Irving B. Weiner is an American psychologist and past president of Division 12 of the American Psychological Association. and past president of the Society for Personality Assessment. He is the author and editor of many books on psychology.

Biography
Weiner obtained his doctorate in clinical psychology from the University of Michigan. He is a Diplomate of the American Board of Professional Psychology in  clinical psychology and forensic psychology. In 1983, he received the  Bruno Klopfer Award for 
Outstanding Lifetime Contribution for "outstanding, long-term professional contribution to the field of personality assessment"  from the Society for Personality Assessment. He is the author of many books and articles, and also an active editor of books and book series. He edited the Handbook of Psychology, published in 2003, which is listed in the "Selective Bibliography of Reference Sources in Psychology" for the Psychology Library at Princeton University.

Currently he is Clinical Professor of Psychiatry and behavioral Medicine at the University of South Florida in Tampa. He is a licensed psychologist within the state of Florida and  practices clinical and forensic psychology.

Published works

Articles

Books

Exner, John E., & Weiner, Irving B. (1994) The Rorschach: Assessment of Children and Adolescents v.3: A Comprehensive System. Wiley. .

References

External links

Weiner, Irving B. Making Rorschach interpretation as good as it can be

Forensic psychologists
21st-century American psychologists
Living people
University of Michigan alumni
Year of birth missing (living people)